Magnesium iron silicate hydroxide  may refer to:

Anthophyllite
Cummingtonite
Serpentine group